The first season of The Good Wife began airing on September 22, 2009 and finished on May 25, 2010. It consisted of 23 episodes.

Premise

The series focuses on Alicia Florrick (Margulies), whose husband Peter (Noth), the former Cook County, Illinois State's Attorney, has been jailed following a notorious political corruption and sex scandal. After having spent the previous thirteen years as a stay-at-home mother, Alicia returns to the workforce as a litigator to provide for her two children.

Cast

Main
 Julianna Margulies as Alicia Florrick
 Matt Czuchry as Cary Agos
 Archie Panjabi as Kalinda Sharma
 Graham Phillips as Zach Florrick
 Makenzie Vega as Grace Florrick
 Josh Charles as Will Gardner
 Christine Baranski as Diane Lockhart

Recurring
 Chris Noth as Peter Florrick
 Mary Beth Peil as Jackie Florrick
 Titus Welliver as Glenn Childs
 Joe Morton as Daniel Golden
 Martha Plimpton as Patti Nyholm
 Jill Flint as Lana Delaney
 Emily Bergl as Bree
 Chris Butler as Matan Brody
 David Paymer as Judge Richard Cuesta
 Alan Cumming as Eli Gold
 Michael Boatman as Julius Cain
 Dylan Baker as Colin Sweeney
 Sonequa Martin-Green as Courtney Wells
 Renée Elise Goldsberry as Geneva Pine
 Dreama Walker as Becca
 Gary Cole as Kurt McVeigh
 Kevin Conway as Jonas Stern
 Carrie Preston as Elsbeth Tascioni
 Zach Grenier as David Lee

Guest
 Mamie Gummer as Nancy Crozier
 Ana Gasteyer as Patrice Lessner
 Mike Colter as Lemond Bishop
 Felix Solis as Kevin Rodriguez
 Nitya Vidyasagar as Frida Verma

Episodes

Reception

The first season of The Good Wife received critical acclaim. The review aggregator website Rotten Tomatoes reports an 85% certified fresh rating based on 27 reviews. The website's consensus reads, "Along with Julianna Margulies and a fine cast, the gripping drama The Good Wife, boasts hook-heavy plotlines torn from the headlines." On Metacritic, the first season of the show currently sits at a 75 out of 100, based on 26 reviews, indicating generally favorable reviews.

Awards and nominations

Primetime Emmy Awards
Nominated for Outstanding Drama Series
Nominated for Outstanding Lead Actress in a Drama Series (Julianna Margulies) (for the episode "Threesome")
Nominated for Outstanding Supporting Actress in a Drama Series (Christine Baranski) (for the episode "Bang")
Won for Outstanding Supporting Actress in a Drama Series (Archie Panjabi) (for the episode "Hi")
Nominated for Outstanding Guest Actor in a Drama Series (Dylan Baker) (for the episode "Bad")
Nominated for Outstanding Guest Actor in a Drama Series (Alan Cumming) (for the episode "Fleas")
Nominated for Outstanding Writing for a Drama Series (Michelle King & Robert King for "Pilot")
Nomination for Outstanding Casting for a Drama Series (Mark Saks)

Ratings

References

2009 American television seasons
2010 American television seasons
1